Vale de Santiago is a Portuguese parish in the municipality of Odemira. The population in 2011 was 1,047, in an area of 112.21 km2.

References

Freguesias of Odemira